Catch Me If You Can is the debut extended play by Canadian country music artist Jess Moskaluke. It was released on September 4, 2012 via MDM Recordings and marks her first studio effort. It include the singles "Catch Me If You Can" and "Hit N' Run". Four of the songs, including the title track, were previously included on her Tyler Ward-distributed 2011 collection, Amen Hallelujah.

Critical reception
Jeff DeDekker of the Leader-Post gave the EP four stars out of five, writing that "by using the full extent of her voice and also incorporating tenderness and fragility, Moskaluke is able to cover the complete spectrum of material." Casadie Pederson of Top Country also gave the EP four stars out of five, calling Moskaluke "one of the best young talents we've seen in a long time."

Track listing

Chart performance

Singles

References

2012 debut EPs
Jess Moskaluke EPs
MDM Recordings albums